Gardefort is a commune in the Cher department in the Centre-Val de Loire region of France.

Geography

Population

Sights
 The church of St. Martin, dating from the nineteenth century.
 Vestiges of a medieval fortification, the "Vieux Château".
 Another old château.

See also
Communes of the Cher department

References

External links

Website about Gardefort 

Communes of Cher (department)